Francis Andrew Brown (born 21 March 1990 in Nottingham) played first-class cricket between 2009 and 2011.

Frankie was educated at Nottingham High School and Jesus College, Cambridge, where he played his first-class matches, initially for Cambridge UCCE against Essex at Fenner's between 11 and 13 June 2009.  He played a further six first-class games, including the University Match in 2009 and 2011 for which he won his Blue.  He was also awarded Blues for playing in the one-day University Matches at Lord's in 2009, 2010 and 2011.

References

1990 births
Living people
Cricketers from Nottingham
People educated at Nottingham High School
Alumni of Jesus College, Cambridge
English cricketers
Cambridge University cricketers
Cambridge MCCU cricketers